USS Rockingham (APA/LPA-229) was a Haskell-class attack transport in service with the United States Navy from 1944 to 1947. She was scrapped in 1979.

History
Rockingham was laid down as Victory ship 11 September 1944 by Kaiser Shipbuilding Corp., Vancouver, Washington; launched 1 November 1944; sponsored by Mrs. Lynn Norman Carlson; acquired by the Navy from the Maritime Commission on a loan-charter basis and commissioned at Astoria, Oregon, 22 November 1944.

World War II 
Following trials at Seattle, Washington, and shakedown off San Pedro, California, Rockingham reported to the U.S. Pacific Fleet 30 December 1944. After amphibious training off the southern California coast, she was underway on 16 February 1945 from San Diego, California, with cargo for Pearl Harbor. Following further training exercises in the Hawaiian Islands, she steamed 10 March for Eniwetok and Saipan with over a thousand U.S. Army men. Operating in the Marianas until 15 April, she departed Saipan with over 1,200 troops and officers for Ulithi and Okinawa.

Battle of Okinawa
On 26 April she debarked her troops at Okinawa. On 27 April, Rockingham experienced the first of many enemy air attacks, witnessing the sinking by a suicide Kamikaze plane of nearby SS Canada Victory. The next morning, Rockingham joined  in splashing a kamikaze. On 1 May Rockingham sent boats to assist , hit and badly damaged by a suicide plane, taking on board 55 casualties. On 4 May she got underway in convoy for Ulithi, Pearl Harbor, and San Francisco. There she loaded over 1,300 troops and got underway 6 June for Eniwetok, Ulithi, and Manila where she debarked her passengers.

Post-war 
Returning to San Francisco, California, 28 July she loaded some 1,600 Army troops and got underway on 14 August, the first U.S. naval vessel to leave San Francisco Bay following the announcement of peace. She proceeded to Eniwetok, Ulithi and Manila where she debarked her troops. Embarking 1,500 new Army troops there, she got underway 17 September for Japan. After unloading troops on the Tokyo Plain, she proceeded to Leyte and Samar to pick up veterans and returned to San Francisco, 5 November. She then made another "Operation Magic Carpet" run to the Philippines reaching Los Angeles, California, 23 December.

Operation Crossroads
Remaining on the U.S. West Coast until 11 March, she steamed for Eniwetok and Kwajalein to participate in the Joint Task Force 1 atomic bomb tests. Returning to San Francisco by way of Pearl Harbor 29 April, she was back at Pearl on 14 May. Proceeding on to Kwajalein and Bikini Atoll where she arrived 1 June, she returned to Pearl Harbor briefly 11 June, then steamed back to Bikini and Kwajalein before finally steaming for Pearl Harbor and San Francisco, where she arrived 12 September 1946.

Decommissioning and fate
She was detached from Operation Crossroads, 14 September 1946; and, following radiological clearance, reported to the U.S. 19th Fleet 5 December 1946. She was placed out of commission in the Pacific Reserve Fleet at San Francisco 17 March 1947. The Commander, Columbia River Group, accepted custody of Rockingham from the Commander, San Francisco Group, 18 June 1953. She was transferred to the Maritime Administration at Astoria, Oregon, 26 September 1958 and struck from the Navy list 1 October 1958.
She was scrapped by Don Kur Steel Corporation of South Korea. Removed from Maritime Administration records 19 November 1979.

Awards 
Rockingham earned one battle star for World War II service.

References

External links 

 NavSource Online: Amphibious Photo Archive - APA/LPA-229 Rockingham

Haskell-class attack transports
Rockingham County, New Hampshire
Rockingham County, North Carolina
Rockingham County, Virginia
World War II amphibious warfare vessels of the United States
Troop ships
Ships built in Vancouver, Washington
1944 ships